Marco Braida (born 26 November 1966) is a retired Italian swimmer who won a bronze medal in the 4 × 100 m medley relay at the 1989 European Aquatics Championships. He also competed at the 1992 Summer Olympics in two butterfly events, but did not reach the finals.

References

1966 births
Living people
Italian male swimmers
Swimmers at the 1992 Summer Olympics
Italian male butterfly swimmers
Olympic swimmers of Italy
European Aquatics Championships medalists in swimming
Mediterranean Games bronze medalists for Italy
Mediterranean Games medalists in swimming
Swimmers at the 1991 Mediterranean Games
20th-century Italian people
21st-century Italian people